Kasper Kaan Kairinen (born 22 December 1998) is a Finnish footballer currently playing for Czech First League club Sparta Prague. He was born to a Turkish father and a Finnish mother in Turku.

Club career

FC Inter Turku
Kairinen is a youth exponent from FC Inter Turku. He made his Veikkausliiga debut at 25 October 2014 against FF Jaro, coming on as a substitute for Kalle Kauppi after 70 minutes in a 0–1 home defeat. Kairinen became the second-youngest player in Inter Turku's history to play for the club, since he made his debut at the age of 15.

FC Midtjylland
On 1 February 2016, it was confirmed by FC Midtjylland, that they had signed with Kairinen.

On 14 November 2018, Midtjylland announced that Kairinen would spend 2019 at HJK Helsinki on a loan deal.

AC Sparta Prague
On 20 December 2022, it was confirmed by Sparta Prague, that they had signed with Kairinen.

International
He made his debut for the Finland national football team on 8 January 2019 in a friendly against Sweden, as a 54th-minute substitute for Rasmus Schüller.

Honours

Individual
Veikkausliiga Breakthrough of the Year: 2015, 2017

Style of play

References

External links
 
 

1998 births
Living people
Finnish footballers
Association football midfielders
Finland youth international footballers
Finland under-21 international footballers
Finland international footballers
FC Inter Turku players
Helsingin Jalkapalloklubi players
Lillestrøm SK players
Veikkausliiga players
Norwegian First Division players
Finnish people of Turkish descent
Footballers from Turku
Finnish expatriate sportspeople in Norway
Expatriate footballers in Norway
AC Sparta Prague players
Expatriate footballers in the Czech Republic
Finnish expatriate sportspeople in the Czech Republic